Anniversary Celebration is the twentieth studio album by American country music singer Randy Travis. It was released on June 7, 2011, by Warner Bros. Records to celebrate 25 years since the release of Travis' 1986 debut album, Storms of Life.

Track listing

Charts

References

2011 albums
Randy Travis albums